Bedellia ipomoella is a moth in the family Bedelliidae. It was described by Kuroko in 1982. It is found in Japan and Taiwan.

References

Natural History Museum Lepidoptera generic names catalog

Bedelliidae
Moths described in 1982